John McInnes (29 March 1923 – 8 February 1998) was a Scottish professional footballer who played as an inside forward.

Career
Born in Ayr, McInnes spent his early career with Partick Thistle and Raith Rovers.

McInnes joined Bradford City in May 1949. He made 21 league appearances for the club, scoring 6 goals He left the club in August 1951 after being released.

Sources

References

1923 births
1998 deaths
Scottish footballers
Partick Thistle F.C. players
Raith Rovers F.C. players
Bradford City A.F.C. players
Scottish Football League players
English Football League players
Association football inside forwards